Docklands Station (Stáisiún Dugthailte) is a terminus railway station serving the Dublin Docklands area in Ireland. It is owned and operated by Iarnród Éireann and was part of the Irish Government's Transport 21 initiative.

The station is one of three termini for the Western Commuter service run by Iarnród Éireann, the others being Dublin Connolly and Dublin Pearse.

Services

Services run to M3 Parkway during peak times, Monday to Friday. The station is closed on Saturday and Sunday.  Passengers need to change at Clonsilla for connection with the Maynooth service.

Transport links
The Luas Red Line does not directly connect with Docklands Station.  Instead, commuters have to walk approximately  via an indirect route to Spencer Dock Luas stop or to Mayor Square - NCI Luas stop. The Luas line gives a direct connection to Busáras Bus station and Dublin Heuston.

The station is linked to the city centre by Dublin Bus route 151.

History
The station was officially opened for commuter services by then Taoiseach Bertie Ahern at a temporary location on Sheriff Street in the North Wall area of Dublin's Northside on 12 March 2007, construction groundbreaking having taken place on 9 March 2006 with Transport Minister Martin Cullen.  It is the first new heavy rail station in Dublin city centre since Grand Canal Dock opened in 2001. It was required because the nearby Connolly Station had reached capacity and could not support additional commuter services to County Meath.

However, in March 2008, it was reported that the transport minister, Noel Dempsey, would allow CIÉ to seek new planning permission to keep the station on a permanent basis as a terminus for services from Maynooth and Navan following his decision to allow the Railway Procurement Agency to use Broadstone Station for extensions to the Luas.

Proposals
The station was to move to a permanent location in the Spencer Dock site as part of the DART Underground plan under the government's Transport 21 initiative. Planning conditions attached to the temporary site stated that it had to be removed by May 2016, but permanent permission was obtained in time to avoid this.

See also
 List of railway stations in Ireland
 Rail transport in Ireland
 Dublin Suburban Rail

References

External links

Irish Rail Docklands Station website
Irish Rail DART Underground Project Website
Dublin Docklands Transport Map
Comment on suitability of Docklands Station
Eiretrains - Docklands Station

Railway termini in Dublin (city)
Iarnród Éireann stations in Dublin (city)
Railway stations opened in 2007
2007 establishments in Ireland
Dublin Docklands
Railway stations in the Republic of Ireland opened in the 21st century